Black Anvil is an American black metal band from New York City. It formed in 2007 with Paul Delaney, Gary Bennett and Raeph Glicken. When asked, Delaney said “Gary actually came up with name, which is a cross between a Black Sabbath reference and a Judas Priest song.” It is one of the few bands in the New York City black metal scene.

History

Early years and Time Insults the Mind (2007–2009)
The band formed in New York City in 2007 and signed to Monumentum Records once the members left the hardcore punk band Kill Your Idols, who disbanded at that time. On October 28, 2008, the band released their debut album Time Insults the Mind on Monumentum Records. The band took a year to write it and went to record it in Queens, New York and recorded it all in one weekend. Afterwards, they started playing gigs all over New York City. The band also said something about the meaning of the album title saying “That it keeps going. (Time that is…) It’s a line in “Margin for Terror” that stuck out when we were thinking of titles.”

Triumvirate (2010–2011)
On June 5th 2010, it was announced that the band signed to Relapse Records. The band began to record their second album in January 2010 in the studio owned by Mark Mendoza of the heavy metal band Twisted Sister with engineer George Fullan. On September 28th, the band released their second album Triumvirate on Relapse Records and reissued their debut in the fall of 2010 on Relapse Records. In an interview, Paul Delaney said “Relapse’s interest in us and our respect for them proves none of that style shit should matter. We’re here to bring a malicious record to the table for you all. We currently have four songs demoed and they’re so dangerous sounding.” During March 13, they played at the Scion Rock Fest in Ohio with Voivod, Black Tusk and Brutal Truth. They also began to tour around United States but ended the major tour in the last two shows being in Canada. The band were going to have a tour called Lawless States of Heretika and Behemoth had joined their tour with Watain and Withered involved as well. However, it was confirmed in August 2010 that Behemoth were forced to leave the tour with them across America due to health issues Behemoth member Nergal was having. Later on August 27, 2010, they performed a major show at the Hostile City Deathfest in Philadelphia. They also toured from November 6, 2010 to December 4, 2010 with Swedish black metal band Watain and American blackened death metal band Goatwhore. The band also had a major tour announced in January 2011 to begin at the end of May through beginning of June during 2011, touring with bands like Aura Noir, Eyehategod, Marduk, and others.

Touring, new member and Hail Death (2012–2015)
The band said that they are working on a new album and they have written some tracks and will enter the studio to record it in early 2013. In an interview, band member Paul Delaney said  The band also took another tour with Watain in the middle of May 2012. During the fall of 2012, the band acquired a 4th member as Jeremy Sosville joined the band on guitar. The band announced his name is Sos and that he plays the second guitar. The band performed a major show with the death/doom band Evoken at Saint Vitus in Brooklyn, New York on December 21, 2012. The band also performed another major show at the Winter's Wake in Pittsburgh on February 22, 2012. The band worked with J. Robbins of Jawbox. The band announced their upcoming album is called Hail Death and its release date is on May 27, 2014. The band says the album has a lot of influences from albums like Master of Puppets by Metallica and Destroyer by KISS. In an interview, Paul Delaney said  Paul also said the making of the new album wasn't easy due to hard times in his life he was going through.

As Was and Regenesis (2016–present)
In November 2016, the band announced their fourth album, As Was, would be released on January 13, 2017. The band went on tour in North America in January and February of 2017 with Mayhem and Inquisition in support of the album.

In August 2022, the band announced their fifth album, Regenesis, would be released on November 4. The band will tour in the fall of 2022 in support of the album with Cannibal Corpse, Dark Funeral and Immolation.

Musical style and influences
The band's musical genres are black metal and thrash metal. However, when asked about what they think of ones who talk about who is the most true black metal band, the band said:  The band has cited Poison Idea, Celtic Frost, Black Sabbath, Metallica, Agnostic Front, Possessed, Sodom, Kreator, Carnivore, Venom, Twisted Sister, Mercyful Fate, Darkthrone, Bad Brains and Black Flag as their influences.

Discography
Studio albums
 Time Insults the Mind (2008)
 Triumvirate (2010)
 Hail Death (2014)
 As Was (2017)
 Regenesis (2022)

Members
Current members
 Paul Delaney  – bass, lead vocals (2007–present)
 Raeph Glicken  – drums, backing vocals (2007–present)
 Jeremy Sosville  – guitars (2012–present)
 Travis Bacon – guitars (2016–present)
 Alex Volonino – guitars (2022–present)

Former members
 Gary Bennett – guitars (2007–2016)

References

External links
 

2007 establishments in New York City
American black metal musical groups
Musical groups established in 2007
Musical groups from New York City
American thrash metal musical groups
Heavy metal musical groups from New York (state)
Relapse Records artists